Makrinitsa dance, is  Greek traditional dance from Naousa, Greece. It is a female dance and is connected with the Greek war of independence.

See also
Music of Greece
Greek dances

References
Ελληνικοί παραδοσιακοί χοροί - Μακρυνίτσα

Greek dances
Greek music
Macedonia (Greece)